The 1999 Indian general election in Delhi, occurred for 7 seats in the state.

List of Elected MPs

1999 Indian general election
Indian general elections in Delhi
1990s in Delhi